Micropterix fenestrellensis is a species of moth belonging to the family Micropterigidae. It was described by John Heath and T. Kaltenbach in 1984. It is known from Italy.

References

Micropterigidae
Endemic fauna of Italy
Moths described in 1984
Moths of Europe
Taxa named by John Heath